Mount Sanford is a shield volcano in the Wrangell Volcanic Field, in eastern Alaska near the Copper River. It is the sixth highest mountain in the United States and the third highest volcano behind Mount Bona and Mount Blackburn.  The south face of the volcano, at the head of the Sanford Glacier, rises  in  resulting in one of the steepest gradients in North America.

Geology 

Mount Sanford is mainly composed of andesite, and is an ancient peak, being mostly Pleistocene, although some of the upper parts of the mountain may be Holocene.  The mountain first began developing 900,000 years ago, when it began growing on top of three smaller shield volcanoes that had coalesced.  Although obscured by icefields, the uppermost  of the mountain appear to be a lava dome filling a larger summit crater.

The second flow was basaltic in nature and marks the most recent activity of the volcano. The flow was dated using radiometric methods.

Observers have reported minor activity at Sanford, primarily vapor clouds or plumes from ice and rockfalls. Some reported incidents may have been orographic clouds, while others have been interpreted as avalanches.

The majority of Mount Sanford above  is covered by icefields, merging to the south with that surrounding Mount Wrangell. The largest glacier on Sanford is the Sanford Glacier, whose source lies at the steep cirque that cuts into the south side of the mountain.

History 
The mountain was named in 1885 by Lieutenant Henry T. Allen of the U.S. Army, a descendant of Reuben Sanford (an American politician).

Mount Sanford was first climbed on July 21, 1938 by noted mountaineers Terris Moore and Bradford Washburn, via the still-standard North Ramp route up the Sheep Glacier. This route "offers little technical difficulty" and "is a glacier hike all the way to the summit" but is still a serious mountaineering challenge (Alaska Grade 2) due to the altitude and latitude of the peak. The base of the route is usually accessed by air, but landing near the mountain is not straightforward.

On March 12, 1948, Northwest Airlines Flight 4422 crashed into Mount Sanford. All 24 passengers and 6 crew members were killed. The wreckage was quickly covered by snow and was not found again until 1999.

The first solo ascent of Mount Sanford was achieved on September 19, 1968, by Japanese mountaineer Naomi Uemura, who later died just after making the first solo winter ascent of Denali.

See also

List of mountain peaks of North America
List of mountain peaks of the United States
List of mountain peaks of Alaska
List of the highest major summits of the United States
List of the most prominent summits of the United States
List of the most isolated major summits of the United States
List of volcanoes in the United States

References

Sources

External links
 Mount Sanford at the Alaska Volcano Observatory
 

Shield volcanoes of the United States
Mountains of Alaska
Volcanoes of Alaska
Landforms of Copper River Census Area, Alaska
Wrangell–St. Elias National Park and Preserve
Pleistocene shield volcanoes
Pleistocene North America
Quaternary United States
Mount Sanford
Mountains of Unorganized Borough, Alaska
Volcanoes of Unorganized Borough, Alaska
Polygenetic shield volcanoes